Thomas Henry Wisdom (16 February 1906 – 12 November 1972) was a British motoring correspondent for the Daily Herald. He was also a racing driver who took part in numerous races and rallies.

Wisdom was born in Brighton. His wife Elsie (known as "Bill") was also a racing driver, and their daughter Ann Wisdom competed in International rallies, most notably as Pat Moss's co-driver.

Tommy Wisdom, died in Birmingham, aged 66.

Racing, rallying and record-breaking
Wisdom specialised in endurance events and entered 52 sports car races in 33 years, including 12 Le Mans 24-hour races, 10 Mille Miglias and 4 Targa Florios. He was a class winner in the Mille Miglia in 1949, 1952 and 1957, and at Le Mans in 1950 and 1952. In 1950 he lent his Jaguar XK120 to Stirling Moss for the RAC Tourist Trophy, which brought Moss his first major international race victory.

Cars that Wisdom raced included Singer, Riley, MG, Jaguar, Aston Martin, Bristol, Nash-Healey, Austin-Healey, Jowett and Bentley, and among his co-drivers were Jack Fairman, Leslie Johnson, and Graham Whitehead.

An experienced rally driver, he competed in the Monte Carlo Rally 23 times.

In 1959 he was a member of the three-driver BMC team whose EX-219 streamliner, a purpose-built experimental Austin-Healey Sprite, broke 12 speed records at Bonneville Salt Flats. The car averaged  for 12 hours.

Sports car racing results

References

British racing drivers
24 Hours of Le Mans drivers
Mille Miglia drivers
1906 births
1972 deaths